Adnan Taletovich is a Croatian male model, photographer and fashion designer of his own clothing label, Adventuryx.

Taletovich came into prominence during the early 1990s and was photographed by fashion photographers such as Mario Testino, Karl Lagerfeld, Albert Watson and Arthur Elgort. He appeared in several magazines, automobile commercials, advertising campaigns for luxury fashion houses and fragrance brands like Paco Rabanne and Lacoste.

Notably, fashion designer and photographer Karl Lagerfeld used Taletovich as a model for some of his work in the 1990s, particularly from 1992 to 1997. In 2015, Lagerfeld cast Taletovich in Chanel's film Reincarnation, portraying the night porter in the fantasy scene.

References

External links

1966 births
Croatian models
Living people
Place of birth missing (living people)
Male models